It's Nothing Personal is the fifth studio album by American metalcore band Bury Your Dead. The album was released on May 26, 2009, through Victory Records. It was also the last album to be released on that label and to feature Myke Terry (Volumes) on vocals.

The album peaked at the Billboard 200 at number 142.

Track listing

Personnel
Myke Terry - vocals
Brendan "Slim" MacDonald - guitar
Chris Towning - guitar
Aaron "Bubble" Patrick - bass guitar
Mark Castillo - drums

References

External links
Victory Records - Bury Your Dead

Bury Your Dead albums
2009 albums
Victory Records albums
Nu metalcore albums